Gustavus may refer to:
Gustavus, Alaska, a small community located on the edge of Glacier Bay National Park and Preserve
Gustavus Adolphus College, a private liberal arts college in southern Minnesota
Gustavus (name), a given name
Gustavus, the Latin name given to several Swedish kings:
Gustav I of Sweden (Gustav Vasa)
Gustavus Adolphus of Sweden (Gustav II Adolf)
Gustavus III of Sweden
Gustaf IV Adolf of Sweden
Gustaf V of Sweden (1858-1950)
Gustaf VI Adolf of Sweden (1882-1973)
 Operation Gustavus, World War II British commando operation in  Malaya
 Gustavus (horse)

See also

 Gustav (disambiguation)
 Gusty (disambiguation)